The 2009 Cadet World Championship were held in Buenos Aires, Argentina between 1 and 10 December 2009.

Podium

Cadet World Championship
Sailing competitions in Argentina
Sports competitions in Buenos Aires
Cadet World Championships